Stephen Richard Scott (born 5 November 1966) is a Welsh former professional footballer who played as a defender. He started as a youth player at Wrexham and later re-signed for the club making appearances in the English Football League for the club under non-contract terms. He also played for Oswestry Town, Lex XI, Bridgnorth Town, Brymbo Steelworks, Shifnal Town and Newtown. He is now the managing director of a company called Activ4.

References

1966 births
Living people
Welsh footballers
Association football defenders
Oswestry Town F.C. players
Wrexham A.F.C. players
Newtown A.F.C. players
Brymbo F.C. players
Shifnal Town F.C. players
Lex XI F.C. players
A.F.C. Bridgnorth players
English Football League players